Enterococcus solitarius is a species of Enterococcus.

Transfer to Tetragenococcus has been proposed.

References

solitarius
Bacteria described in 1989